Anthony Stewart (born 15 April 1970) is an Australian former professional basketball player who played 17 seasons in the National Basketball League (NBL). He also played multiple seasons for the Hobart Chargers in the South East Australian Basketball League (SEABL).

Career
Stewart began his career with the Hobart Devils in 1992, but later joined the Perth Wildcats in 1995 to become an integral part of the Wildcats championship team that year. Stewart continued with the Wildcats for five more seasons and won another championship with the team in 2000. He left the club following his second championship and joined the Cairns Taipans.

Stewart played seven seasons with the Taipans before leaving the club and joining the Townsville Crocodiles for the 2007–08 NBL season. However, he managed just four games for the Crocodiles and did not return to the club for the 2008–09 season. Stewart continued to participate in the SEABL where he spent time as a player and a coach from 2008 to 2013.

References

External links
Eurobasket.com profile

1970 births
Living people
Australian men's basketball players
Cairns Taipans players
Guards (basketball)
Hobart Devils players
Perth Wildcats players
Townsville Crocodiles players